Exilarch is the third album by Conjure One, a project of Canadian electronic musician and producer Rhys Fulber. The album was initially released as a worldwide digital download on October 19, 2010, while the physical release was made available in the US on November 9, 2010. The CD was eventually also released in UK and Europe on April 15, 2011.

Release and promotion
The album spawned two singles ahead of its release. First out was the 7 track remix EP "I Dream in Colour", released on June 29, 2010. The second single, "Like Ice", was initially released for streaming only through Conjure One's official Myspace, but was later released as the album's second 7 track remix EP on April 12, 2011.

Track listing

Personnel

Conjure One
 Rhys Fulber – production, mixing, programming

Additional musicians
 Jaren Cerf – vocals (1, 3, 6)
 Leah Randi – vocals (7, 8), bass guitar, additional backing vocals
 Azam Ali – vocals (4)
 Free Dominguez – vocals (9)
 Jamie Muhoberac – additional keyboard
 Emerson Swinford – guitar
 Chris Elliott – strings arrangement (7, 11)
 Wired Strings – strings (7, 11)
 Mark Jowett – cello (1)
 Daniel Myer – additional drum loop (11)

Technical personnel
 Greg Reely – multitrack mastering (1), additional engineering (1), mixing (1), technical support
 Craig Waddell – mastering
 Frank Verschuuren – technical support
 Rick Smith – technical support
 Jaroslaw Baran – technical support
 Michał Karcz – cover art, design
 John Rummen – Conjure One logo

References

2010 albums
Conjure One albums
Nettwerk Records albums
Ethnic electronica albums